The 2019 Men's Sultana Bran Hockey One  was the inaugural men's edition of Hockey Australia's national league, Hockey One. The tournament was held across 7 states and territories of Australia. The tournament started on 29 September and culminated on 16 November 2019.

The grand final of the tournament was hosted by HC Melbourne, as the top ranked team to qualify for the final in the women's league.

NSW Pride won the tournament after defeating Brisbane Blaze 8–3 in the final. Tassie Tigers finished in bronze position, following results from the pool stage.

Competition format

Format
The 2019 Hockey One will follow a similar format to that of the final edition of the Australian Hockey League. Teams will play a series of home and away matches during the Pool Stage, which will be followed by a Classification Round.

During the pool stage, teams play each other once in either a home or a way fixture. The top four ranked teams will then qualify for the Classification Round, playing in two semi-finals with the winners contesting a grand final. Team 1 will host Team 4, while Team 2 will host Team 3. Of the two victorious teams, the higher ranked team from the pool stage will host the grand final.

Rules
In addition to FIH sanctioned rules, Hockey Australia is implementing the following rules for Hockey One:

 When a field goal or penalty stroke is scored the same athlete will have an automatic one-on-one shootout with the goalkeeper for an extra goal.
 Outright winner: There will be no drawn games. In the event of a draw, teams will contest a penalty shoot-out to determine a winner.

Point Allocation
Match points will be distributed as follows:

 5 points: win
 3 points: shoot-out win
 2 points: shoot-out loss
 0 points: loss

Participating teams
The seven teams competing in the league come from Australia's states and territories, with the Northern Territory being the only team absent.

Head Coach: Mark Victory

Lachlan Busiko (C)
Angus Fry
Scott Germein
Fred Gray
Cameron Joyce
Luke Larwood
Andrew Leat
Daniel Mitchell
Alastair Oliver
Glyn Tamlin
Isaac Farmilo
Simon Wells
Chris Wells
Cameron White
Hirotaka Zendana
Kota Watanabe
Liam Alexander
Ross Hetem
Ben Hooppell 
Edward Chittleborough (GK)

Head Coach: Matt Wells

Shane Kenny
Corey Weyer
Hugh Pembroke
Scott Boyde
Joel Rintala
Jacob Anderson (C)
Robert Bell 
Matthew Pembroke
Jacob Whetton
Ethan White
Luke Tyne
Justin Douglas
Tim Howard
Blake Wotherspoon
Matthew Swann
Daniel Beale
Dylan Wotherspoon
Jared Taylor
Matthew Finn (GK)
Mitchell Nicholson (GK)

Head Coach: Peter Morgan

Aaron Knight
Ben Staines
Anand Gupte
James Day
Lewis Shepherd
Kazuma Murata
Daniel Conroy
Jamie Hawke
Owen Chivers
Garry Backhus
Jake Staines
Manabu Yamashita
Josh Chivers
Aaron Kershaw (C)
Lewis McLennan
Jay MacDonald
James Jewell
Kentaro Fukuda
Andrew Charter (GK)
Brendan Hill (GK)

Head Coach: Lachlan Anderson

Craig Marais
Max Hendry
Simon Borger
Andrew Philpott
Will Gilmour
Joshua Pollard
Nathan Ephraums
Russell Ford (C)
George Bazeley (GK)
Casey Hammond
Jayshaan Randhawa
Jonathan Bretherton
Joshua Simmonds
Kiran Arunasalam
Johan Durst (GK)
Jake Sherren
Joel Carroll
James Knee
Aaron Kleinschmidt
Oscar Wookey

Head Coach: Brent Livermore

Lachlan Sharp
Tom Craig (C)
BJ Bruton (GK)
Lain Carr
Ash Thomas (GK)
Matthew Dawson
Daine Richards
Nathanael Stewart
Hayden Dillon
Kurt Lovett
Blake Govers
Tristan White
Jack Hayes
Ky Willott
Flynn Ogilvie
Ryan Proctor
Dylan Martin
Ehren Hazell
Sam Gray
Timothy Brand

Head Coach: Alistair Park

Brayden King
Tim Geers
Jake Harvie
Frazer Gerrard
James Collins
Tyler Lovell (GK)
Coby Green
Dane Gavranich
Tom Wickham
Daniel Rayney
Liam Flynn
Will Byas
Aran Zalewski (C)
Ben Rennie (GK)
Daniel Robertson
Matthew Fisher
Alec Rasmussen
Trent Mitton
Brandon Gibbs
Marshall Roberts

 Tassie Tigers|bodystyle=font-size:110%}}
Head Coach: Andrew McDonald

<li value=2>Nick Leslie
Kurt Budgeon
Hayden Beltz
<li value=6>Joshua Brooks
Joshua Mardell
<li value=10>Linden McCarthy
Eddie Ockenden (C)
Samuel McCulloch
Joshua Beltz
Jack Welch
Kieron Arthur
<li value=18>Grant Woodcock (GK)
Tim Deavin
James Bourke
Ben Read
<li value=23>Henry Chambers (GK)
<li value=26>Oliver Smith
Gobindraj Gill
<li value=29>Sam McCambridge
<li value=32>Jeremy Hayward

Venues

Results

Pool stage
 Canberra Chill
|name_NSW =  NSW Pride
|name_BRI =  Brisbane Blaze
|name_ADL =  Adelaide Fire
|name_TAS =  Tassie Tigers
|name_MEL =  HC Melbourne
|name_PER =  Perth Thundersticks

|winpoints=5
|OTwinpoints=3
|OTlosspoints=2
|losspoints=0

|class_rules = 1) points; 2) matches won; 3) goal difference; 4) goals for; 5) head-to-head result; 6) field goals scored.

|res_col_header=Q
|col_Q=green1 |text_Q=Semi-finals
}}

Matches
 
|score   = 2–1
|team2   =  Adelaide Fire
|goals1  = Hazell Govers 
|report  = Report
|goals2  = Busiko 
|stadium = Sydney Olympic Park, Sydney
|umpires = Zeke Newman (AUS)Stephen Versteegh (AUS)
}}

 
|score   = 4–5
|team2   =  HC Melbourne
|goals1  = Wickham Mitton 
|report  = Report
|goals2  = Ephraums Ford 
|stadium = Perth Hockey Stadium, Perth
|umpires = Matthew Claxton (AUS)Daniel Johnston (AUS)
}}

 
|score   = 1–4
|team2   =  Brisbane Blaze
|goals1  = Kershaw 
|report  = Report
|goals2  = Rintala Douglas Anderson 
|stadium = National Hockey Centre, Canberra
|umpires = Stirling Sharpe (AUS)David Bridgford (AUS)
}}

 
|score   = 0–7
|team2   =  NSW Pride
|goals1  = 
|report  = Report
|goals2  = Craig Govers Lovett Brand 
|stadium = National Hockey Centre, Canberra
|umpires = Stirling Sharpe (AUS)David Bridgford (AUS)
}}

 
|score   = 5–1
|team2   =  Adelaide Fire
|goals1  = Leslie McCambridge Hayward H. Beltz 
|report  = Report
|goals2  = Zendana 
|stadium = Tasmanian Hockey Centre, Hobart
|umpires = Jayden Pearson (AUS)Tim Pullman (AUS)
}}

|score   = 2–4
|team2   =  Brisbane Blaze
|goals1  = Simmonds 
|report  = Report
|goals2  = Whetton Boyde Taylor 
|stadium = State Netball and Hockey Centre, Melbourne
|umpires = James Unkles (AUS)Ben Hocking (AUS)
}}

 
|score   = 4–2
|team2   =  Tassie Tigers
|goals1  = Govers 
|report  = Report
|goals2  = McCambridge Ockenden 
|stadium = Sydney Olympic Park, Sydney
|umpires = Zeke Newman (AUS)Stephen Versteegh (AUS)
}}

 
|score   = 3–3
|team2   =  Canberra Chill 
|goals1  = Geers King Wickham 
|report  = Report
|goals2  = J. Staines B. Staines 
|penalties1 = Zalewski Wickham Mitton Green 
|penaltyscore = 1–3
|penalties2 =  Murata Day Backhus J. Staines
|stadium = Perth Hockey Stadium, Perth
|umpires = Peter Wright (RSA)Daniel Johnston (AUS)
}}

 
|score   = 1–5
|team2   =  Brisbane Blaze 
|goals1  = Farmilo 
|report  = Report
|goals2  = Weyer Rintala 
|stadium = State Hockey Centre, Adelaide
|umpires = Tim Pullman (AUS)Nathan Jennings (AUS)
}}

 
|score   = 7–0
|team2   =  Tassie Tigers 
|goals1  = Beale Rintala Weyer D. Wotherspoon 
|report  = Report
|goals2  =
|stadium = Queensland State Hockey Centre, Brisbane
|umpires = Adam Kearns (AUS)Ben de Young (AUS)
}}

 
|score   = 4–6
|team2   =  Perth Thundersticks 
|goals1  = Watanabe 
|report  = Report
|goals2  = Mitton Robertson Rasmussen Wickham 
|stadium = State Hockey Centre, Adelaide
|umpires = Tim Pullman (AUS)Nathan Jennings (AUS)
}}

|score   = 10–5
|team2   =  Canberra Chill 
|goals1  = Arunasalam Kleinschmidt Marais Gilmour 
|report  = Report
|goals2  = Backhus Conroy 
|stadium = State Netball and Hockey Centre, Melbourne
|umpires = James Unkles (AUS)Timothy Sheahan (AUS)
}}

 
|score   = 6–1
|team2   =  HC Melbourne
|goals1  = Lovett Govers Ogilvie 
|report  = Report
|goals2  = Ford 
|stadium = Sydney Olympic Park, Sydney
|umpires = Zeke Newman (AUS)Adam Kearns (AUS)
}}

 
|score   = 5–1
|team2   =  Perth Thundersticks 
|goals1  = Weyer Rintala D. Wotherspoon Beale 
|report  = Report
|goals2  = Mitton 
|stadium = Queensland State Hockey Centre, Brisbane
|umpires = Ben de Young (AUS)Stephen Rogers (AUS)
}}

 
|score   = 2–6
|team2   =  Tassie Tigers 
|goals1  = Fukuda 
|report  = Report
|goals2  = Ockenden Hayward McCambridge 
|stadium = National Hockey Centre, Canberra
|umpires = Stirling Sharpe (AUS)David Bridgford (AUS)
}}

 
|score   = 1–8
|team2   =  NSW Pride
|goals1  = Harvie 
|report  = Report
|goals2  = Govers Willott Brand Dawson 
|stadium = Perth Hockey Stadium, Perth
|umpires = Matthew Claxton (AUS)Daniel Johnston (AUS)
}}

 
|score   = 4–6
|team2   =  Canberra Chill 
|goals1  = Fry Farmilo 
|report  = Report
|goals2  = Hawke Day Backhus J. Staines 
|stadium = State Hockey Centre, Adelaide
|umpires = Tim Pullman (AUS)Nathan Jennings (AUS)
}}

 
|score   = 6–5
|team2   =  HC Melbourne
|goals1  = McCambridge Hayward Ockenden 
|report  = Report 
|goals2  = Ephraums Simmonds 
|stadium = Tasmanian Hockey Centre, Hobart
|umpires = James Unkles (AUS)Jayden Pearson (AUS)
}}

 
|score   = 4–0
|team2   =  Perth Thundersticks 
|goals1  = J. Beltz McCambridge Gill 
|report  = Report
|goals2  =
|stadium = Tasmanian Hockey Centre, Hobart
|umpires = Jayden Pearson (AUS)Ben Hocking (AUS)
}}

 
|score   = 0–5
|team2   =  NSW Pride
|goals1  = 
|report  = Report
|goals2  = Sharp Willott Craig 
|stadium = Queensland State Hockey Centre, Brisbane
|umpires = Aaron Gotting (AUS)Stephen Rogers (AUS)
}}

|score   = 6–5
|team2   =  Adelaide Fire 
|goals1  = Ephraums Kleinschmidt Ford Simmonds 
|report  = Report
|goals2  = Watanabe Joyce 
|stadium = State Netball and Hockey Centre, Melbourne
|umpires = Timothy Sheahan (AUS)James Unkles (AUS)
}}

Classification stage
 NSW Pride|6| HC Melbourne|2
|9 November 2019| Brisbane Blaze|7| Tassie Tigers|1

|16 November 2019| NSW Pride|8| Brisbane Blaze|3

|RD1=Semi-finals |RD2=Grand Final

|skipmatch01=no|skipmatch02=no|skipmatch03=no

|team-width=185|score-width=55|bold_winner=high
}}

Semi-finals

|score   = 6–2
|team2   =  HC Melbourne
|goals1  = Stewart Lovett Brand Willott 
|report  = Report
|goals2  = Marais Ford 
|stadium = Sydney Olympic Park, Sydney
|umpires = Adam Kearns (AUS)Stephen Rogers (AUS)
}}

 
|score   = 7–1
|team2   =  Tassie Tigers
|goals1  = Whetton Anderson Rintala B. Wotherspoon D. Wotherspoon 
|report  = Report
|goals2  = Hayward 
|stadium = Queensland State Hockey Centre, Brisbane
|umpires = Ben Hocking (AUS)Zeke Newman (AUS)
}}

Grand final

|score   = 8–3
|team2   =  Brisbane Blaze 
|goals1  = Brand Hayes Ogilvie Lovett 
|report  = Report
|goals2  = Rintala Weyer 
|stadium = State Netball and Hockey Centre, Melbourne
|umpires = Ben Hocking (AUS)Tim Pullman (AUS)
}}

Awards

Statistics

Final standings
 Canberra Chill
|name_NSW =  NSW Pride
|name_BRI =  Brisbane Blaze
|name_ADL =  Adelaide Fire
|name_TAS =  Tassie Tigers
|name_MEL =  HC Melbourne
|name_PER =  Perth Thundersticks

|winpoints=5
|OTwinpoints=3
|OTlosspoints=2
|losspoints=0

|result1=1st |result2=2nd |result3=SF |result4=SF |result5=GS |result6=GS |result7=GS
|pos_NSW= |pos_BRI= |pos_TAS= |split2=yes |split4=yes

|res_col_header=Final standing
|text_1st=Gold Medal
|text_2nd=Silver Medal
|text_SF=Eliminated inSemi-finals
|text_GS=Eliminated inGroup stage
}}

Goalscorers
 Blake Govers

|10 goals=
 Timothy Brand

|9 goals=
 Joel Rintala

|8 goals=
 Kurt Lovett
 Dylan Wotherspoon
 Eddie Ockenden

|7 goals=
 Sam McCambridge
 Russell Ford
 Joshua Simmonds

|6 goals=
 Kota Watanabe

|5 goals=
 Corey Weyer
 Trent Mitton

|4 goals=
 Garry Backhus
 Jake Staines
 Ky Willott
 Jacob Whetton
 Jeremy Hayward
 Kiran Arunasalam
 Nathan Ephraums
 Will Gilmour
 Tom Wickham

|3 goals=
 Tom Craig
 Flynn Ogilvie
 Isaac Farmilo
 Cameron Joyce
 Aaron Kleinschmidt

|2 goals=
 Daniel Conroy
 Kentaro Fukuda
 Jamie Hawke
 Jack Hayes
 Jacob Anderson
 Daniel Beale
 Justin Douglas
 Angus Fry
 Nick Leslie
 Craig Marais
 Daniel Robertson

|1 goal=
 James Day
 Aaron Kershaw
 Ben Staines
 Matthew Dawson
 Ehren Hazell
 Lachlan Sharp
 Nathanael Stewart
 Scott Boyde
 Jared Taylor
 Blake Wotherspoon
 Lachlan Busiko
 Hirotaka Zendana
 Hayden Beltz
 Joshua Beltz
 Gobindraj Gill
 Tim Geers
 Jake Harvie
 Brayden King
 Alec Rasmussen
}}

References

External links
2019 Sultana Bran Men's Hockey One League at Hockey Australia

Hockey One
Hockey One